Benjamin Thomas Stoeger is an American competition shooter and firearms instructor who started competing actively in 2005. He placed first in the 2017 IPSC Handgun World Shoot, second behind Bob Vogel in the 2011 IPSC Handgun World Shoot, and placed third in the 2014 IPSC Handgun World Shoot behind Eric Grauffel and Simon "JJ" Racaza. He is also three time IPSC US Handgun Production Champion (2012, 2013 and 2015), eight time USPSA Handgun Production Champion (2011, 2012, 2013, 2014, 2015, 2017, 2018, and 2019).

Associations 
At Ben Stoeger's personal website benstoeger.com he includes his views and tips about how to shoot the Action Shooting sports of IPSC and USPSA, and some of the latest competition gear for those sports.

Practical Shooting After Dark is a podcast featuring Stoeger and other USPSA competitors discussing the sport.

Practical Shooting Training Group is an online coaching platform for USPSA/IPSC Practical Shooting created by Stoeger and fellow competitor Hwansik Kim.  The site contains drills with video explanations and written diagrams, training video, and a venue to get feedback on student-submitted videos.

Bibliography 
 Books
 Champion Shooting: Guaranteed Results in 15 Minutes A Day (2012) by Jay Hirshberg and Ben Stoeger
 Champion Shooting: A Proven Process for Success at Any Level (2012) by Jay Hirshberg and Ben Stoeger
 Practical Pistol - Fundamental Techniques and Competition Skills (2013) by Ben Stoeger
 Dry-Fire Training: For the Practical Pistol Shooter (2014) by Ben Stoeger
 Skills and Drills: For the Practical Pistol Shooter (2014) by Ben Stoeger, Timmy Meyers, Ronnie Casper, Brandon Edwards
 Practical Pistol Reloaded (2016) by Ben Stoeger
 DryFire Reloaded (2017) by Ben Stoeger
 Skills and Drills Reloaded (2018) by Ben Stoeger
Breakthrough Marksmanship (2019) by Ben Stoeger

 
Videos

 Training to Win with Ben Stoeger (2014)

Practical Pistol Foundations with Ben Stoeger (2015)

See also 
 Eric Grauffel, French sport shooter
 Max Michel, American sport shooter
 Jorge Ballesteros, Spanish sport shooter
Hwansik Kim

References 

Year of birth missing (living people)
Living people
IPSC shooters
American male sport shooters
Place of birth missing (living people)